St. Bernard Township is one of eighteen townships in Platte County, Nebraska, United States. The population was 502 at the 2020 census. A 2021 estimate placed the township's population at 500.

The Village of Lindsay lies within the Township.

History
St. Bernard Township was organized in 1883.

See also
County government in Nebraska

References

External links
City-Data.com

Saint Bernard Township
Townships in Nebraska